TeRra (Live) is TeRra Han's first album released by Poly Music, in 2015.

From 6 century's ancient times to the 21century's live Kayageum Music 
TeRra (Live) is a live performance recordings of Han TeRra's Kayageum music for 15 years 2000-2015. It is representing Korean classical kayageum music from past to present in history of South Korea since 6C's. Such as Kayageum Sanjo, Byungchang which is National Intangible Heritage No.23 of Korea, Contemporary pieces for 21, 25 et.c strings kayageum, Electronic Music, Korean Samulnori improvisational music, Court music, Orchestral concerto.

Musical crisis for 11 years 
In 2015, Han resumed official her activity after period of musical crisis for 11 years with an ebook 'TeRra' written by the Jang Byung Wook who is a columnist in South Korea it published by The Korea Times. Coincidentally live album TeRra (Live) released which is containing her performance for 15 years.

Track listing

Personnel 
 Han Terra – Kayageum
 Seoul Metropolitan Korean traditional music orchestra
 Sukhi Kang
 Roland Breitenfelt

References

Han Terra albums
2015 live albums